Austin Huggins (born 19 January 1970) is a former Kittitian footballer. He is currently manager of Saint Kitts and Nevis.

Club career
In 1999, Huggins joined Irish club Bohemians, making four appearances for the club in the League of Ireland Premier Division. In 2000, Huggins returned to his native Saint Kitts and Nevis, signing for Garden Hotspurs. Huggins played for the club until 2012.

International career
On 2 April 1993, Huggins made his debut for Saint Kitts and Nevis, scoring in a 5–1 win against the British Virgin Islands. In total, Huggins made 36 appearances for Saint Kitts and Nevis, scoring eleven times.

International goals
Scores and results list Saint Kitts and Nevis' goal tally first.

Managerial career
In 2018, Huggins was appointed manager of former club Garden Hotspurs. In January 2022, Huggins was appointed manager of Saint Kitts and Nevis.

References

1970 births
Living people
People from Basseterre
Saint Kitts and Nevis footballers
Association football midfielders
Saint Kitts and Nevis international footballers
Bohemian F.C. players
Garden Hotspurs FC players
League of Ireland players
Expatriate association footballers in the Republic of Ireland
Saint Kitts and Nevis expatriate footballers
Saint Kitts and Nevis football managers
Saint Kitts and Nevis national football team managers